Walter Eugene Ranger was an American academic administrator who served as the president of Rhode Island College in Rhode Island and Johnson State College in Vermont. Born in Wilton, Maine he graduated from Bates College (1879) in Lewiston before becoming the principal of Lennox High School in Massachusetts.

See also 
 List of Bates College people

References 

Maine lawyers
Bates College alumni
People from Franklin County, Maine
Rhode Island College people
Johnson State College faculty
19th-century American lawyers
Year of birth missing
Year of death missing